Sympistis induta is a species of moth in the family Noctuidae (the owlet moths).

The MONA or Hodges number for Sympistis induta is 10060.

References

Further reading

 
 
 

induta
Articles created by Qbugbot
Moths described in 1874